KBS 1 or variation may refer to:

 KBS1, a Korean TV station
 KBS Radio 1, a Korean radio station
 KBS 1FM, a former name of Korean radio station KBS Classic FM

See also
 KBS (disambiguation)
 KBSI (disambiguation)